The 1984 Monaco Grand Prix was a Formula One motor race held at Monaco on 3 June 1984. It was race 6 of 16 in the 1984 FIA Formula One World Championship. It was the only race of the 1984 championship that was run in wet weather.

During practice, Tyrrell's Martin Brundle had a huge crash at the Tabac corner. He landed upside down and was slightly injured, but it was enough to make him a non-qualifier for the race. Brundle later said that he ran back to the pits but was not allowed to get into the spare car as it was discovered he could not actually remember how he returned to the pits. Formula One medical chief Sid Watkins concluded Brundle was slightly concussed and the decision was made not to let him return to the track.

Qualifying
Alain Prost took his first pole position for McLaren with a time of 1:22.661, just ahead of the Lotus-Renault of Nigel Mansell. Prost's pole was also the first pole for the McLaren MP4/2 as well as for the TAG-Porsche engine. Stefan Bellof was the only non-turbo qualifier in his Tyrrell-Cosworth. Bellof qualified 20th and last while Brundle's crash behind the pits at Tabac saw him as a spectator for the race. Bellof's time edged the Arrows-Ford of Marc Surer by just 0.156. The turbo cars of Eddie Cheever (Alfa Romeo) and Thierry Boutsen (Arrows-BMW) both failed to qualify.

BMW had built specially detuned engines for Brabham to use at Monaco. It was also an attempt at better reliability as the team had yet to score a point for the year. Never at ease at Monaco, reigning World Champion Nelson Piquet qualified 9th. With Teo Fabi having commitments to race the US based IndyCars at Milwaukee on the same weekend his brother Corrado Fabi drove the second Brabham, qualifying 15th.

Race
The race, held amidst heavy rain, was one of the most contentious in Formula One history, and announced the emergence of at least two new stars. Alain Prost took the first of his four victories at the circuit.

The race start was delayed by 45 minutes due to the heavy rain. With the rain soaking the track, Niki Lauda sought out Bernie Ecclestone on the grid in a bid to have the tunnel flooded as well. The tunnel was dry but coated with oil from the previous days' use (as well as from the historic cars which were on the program that weekend) which Lauda explained had turned it into a fifth gear skid pad when the cars came racing in carrying the spray from their tyres in the morning warmup. Ecclestone used his power as the head of the Formula One Constructors Association to do exactly that, with a local fire truck called in to water down the only dry road on the track.

Pole-sitter Prost led the race from the start, while first corner contact between Ferrari's René Arnoux and the Renault of Derek Warwick pitched Warwick's car into the fence on the outside of St. Devote and into the path of his team-mate Patrick Tambay. Both drivers suffered leg injuries; Warwick bruised his left leg while Tambay broke his leg after his car's suspension punched through the carbon fibre monocoque, causing him to miss the next round in Canada.

Prost was passed on lap nine by Nigel Mansell, to lead a Grand Prix for the first time, when Prost's TAG engine was misfiring and he was delayed by both Corrado Fabi's stalled Brabham and Michele Alboreto's about-to-be-lapped Ferrari just before the tunnel (Prost actually hit a marshal who was pushing Fabi's car away but with no serious injury). Mansell pulled away from Prost at around two seconds per lap, before going off six laps later on the run up to Casino Square after sliding on a painted white line, damaging his car and retiring from the race. 

Lauda disposed of Arnoux but Prost assumed the lead again, only to have the Toleman-Hart of Ayrton Senna, who had also passed the Ferrari, quickly closing in. Senna had started thirteenth in the generally uncompetitive Toleman, in the first Formula One street race in his rookie season, and was showing his wet weather skills that would become legendary. On lap 29, Prost waved to the stewards of the race to indicate that he felt the race should be stopped. He was also suffering from a major brake imbalance as his McLaren's carbon brakes were locking due to not generating enough heat in the conditions, the same problem that had caused Lauda to spin at Casino Square on lap 23, whereupon he stalled his engine and was out of the race. A slowing Prost waved again on lap 31 as he passed the start/finish line.

The red flag to stop the race was shown at the end of the 32nd lap after clerk of the course Jacky Ickx decided that conditions were too poor for the race to continue. Senna passed Prost's slowing McLaren before the finish line, but according to the rules, the positions counted are those from the last lap completed by every driver – lap 31, at which point Prost was still leading. The stoppage was controversial, as it benefited Prost with a Porsche-designed engine, and was made by Ickx, the lead driver with the factory run Rothmans Porsche team in sports car racing. Ickx was suspended from his race control duties for not consulting with the stewards over his decision before making it. 

Had the race been allowed to continue until 75% of the laps, full points would have been awarded and Prost could have had six points from a second place (or nine for a win) instead of 4.5 points from the half-race win. Prost eventually lost the championship to Niki Lauda by only half a point.

Stefan Bellof, running in the only naturally aspirated car in the race, finished third and had been closing on both Senna and Prost. Bellof had qualified 20th and last in his Tyrrell 012-Cosworth. His drive from last to third was a stand-out achievement in his short career, although he was later disqualified due to weight restrictions broken by Tyrrell. His drive led to negotiations with Ferrari for a drive for 1986 alongside Michele Alboreto, as René Arnoux was under contract in 1985. The Tyrrell team's results were erased later in the season due to weight infringements, meaning that Bellof was stripped of his podium finish, with his place being taken by René Arnoux. It would prove to be Bellof's only podium visit during his Formula One career.  

This was the first time that Ayrton Senna had set a Formula One fastest lap. It was also Toleman's second and final fastest lap in Formula One (Derek Warwick had set the team's only other fastest lap during the 1982 Dutch Grand Prix at Zandvoort).

Classification

Qualifying

*Positions with a pink background indicate drivers that failed to qualify

Race

 Stefan Bellof originally finished 3rd in his Tyrrell but was later disqualified due to weight restrictions broken by Tyrrell.

Championship standings after the race

Drivers' Championship standings

Constructors' Championship standings

References

Monaco Grand Prix
Monaco Grand Prix
Grand Prix